Robert Clive Heatley (6 July 1895 – 22 February 1973) was an Australian rules footballer who played with University in the Victorian Football League (VFL).

After his brief football career Heatley served in France during World War I, being mentioned in despatches for acting "as a runner between Brigade Headquarters and Batteries invariably under heavy enemy shell fire".

Sources

External links

1895 births
University Football Club players
Australian rules footballers from Melbourne
People educated at Scotch College, Melbourne
Australian military personnel of World War I
1973 deaths
People from Carlton, Victoria
Military personnel from Melbourne